Henry Fenton (fl. 1416) of Stafford, was an English politician.

He was a Member (MP) of the Parliament of England for Stafford in March 1416.

References

Year of birth missing
Year of death missing
English MPs March 1416
Members of the Parliament of England (pre-1707) for Stafford